The Adelaide Tambo Award for Human Rights in the Arts is an annual award by the South African National Arts Festival to "honour an artist or company whose work on the Fringe programme embodies Adelaide Tambo's passion for the arts and her deep commitment for human rights."

The winner receives a cash award, as well as production incentive to extend the run of the play and to present the same a new play at the following year's festival.

Recipients 
2018 Forgotten Angle Theatre Collaborative
2017 Ngizwe Youth Theatre for The Little One
2016 Drama for Life for AfriQueer
2015 Irene Stephanou for Searching for Somebody
2014 Harry Kalmer, The Bram Fischer Waltz

References

South African literary awards
Fiction awards
Awards established in 2014
Literary awards honouring human rights